Palestine–South Africa relations refer to the interstate relations between the Republic of South Africa and the State of Palestine.

Bilateral relations 
The African National Congress had close relations with Palestine Liberation Organization. Nelson Mandela had close relations with Yasser Arafat. After the first non-racial elections in 1994, South Africa established diplomatic relations with the State of Palestine on February 15, 1995. Former South African President Nelson Mandela had visited both Israel and Palestine and called for peace between both sides. Nevertheless, some prominent South African figures, such as Desmond Tutu and Ronnie Kasrils have criticized Israel's treatment of the Palestinians, drawing parallels between apartheid South Africa and modern-day Israel. The Congress of South African Trade Unions, which represents 1.2 million South African workers, has also accused Israel of practicing apartheid and supported the boycott launched by the Canadian Union of Public Employees, as well as the boycott of all Israeli products.

Gaza War and after 
During the 2008 to 2009 Gaza War, South Africa's Deputy Minister of Foreign Affairs Fatima Hajaig called on Israel to stop military attacks in Gaza and withdraw its forces from the border immediately, saying, "The South African government finds the continued siege on Gaza unacceptable as it does not allow humanitarian relief supply such as medicine, food and water to reach the desperate people of Gaza." "The South African government unequivocally and in the strongest possible terms condemns the escalation of violence on the part of Israel brought about by the launching Saturday night of a ground invasion into Gaza," read a statement issued by the Department of Foreign Affairs after the start of Israel's ground offensive. South Africa said that, "the violent situation in Gaza and southern Israel made it imperative for the [UN General] Assembly to collectively and publicly voice its condemnation of the attacks and demand that both sides immediately cease their military attacks." The country made a similar call in the UN Security Council.

After the Gaza flotilla raid on 31 May 2010, the South African Department of International Relations and Cooperation issued a statement "strongly condemning all military aggression by Israel against innocent civilians, including those in the occupied West Bank and Gaza." On 3 June, South Africa recalled its ambassador from Israel, and the Israeli ambassador was summoned to the Department of International Relations and Cooperation for a reprimand. During the 2014 Israel-Gaza conflict,  The Department's spokesman, Clayson Monyela, stated that the country "strongly urge all sides to refrain from responding to violence with violence and to exercise restraint, including a halt to the arbitrary arrest of Palestinian civilians and the use of collective punishment on Palestinians."

See also 
Foreign relations of South Africa
Foreign relations of Palestine

References

 
South Africa
Bilateral relations of South Africa